Netball at the 2007 Pacific Games in Apia, Samoa was held from 27 August - 1 September 2007.

Results

Pool A

Pool B

Semi-finals

Consolation matches

7th/8th playoff

5th/6th playoff

Bronze-medal match

Gold-medal match

Final standings

See also
 Netball at the Pacific Games

References

2007 South Pacific Games
South Pacific Games
Netball at the Pacific Games
South Pacific